Brutal Doom is a game mod for the 1993 first-person shooter Doom created by the Brazilian developer Sergeant Mark IV (Marcos Abenante). It adds numerous gameplay elements and graphical effects. The mod has been in development since 2010, and continues to release new updates.

Gameplay 
Brutal Doom adds many gameplay features, such as blood splattering, allied Marines, an updated particle system, the ability to drive vehicles such as tanks, stealth kills, headshots, and a host of "Mortal Kombat-esque fatality animations". Enemy AI has been revamped, with most enemies gaining new attacks and behaviors.

The mod includes new and updated guns, such as a flamethrower, the demonic Unmaker, assault shotguns, new rifle types, a grenade launcher and even allows the player to equip enemy weapons in the form of Revenant missiles or a Mancubus' flame cannon. In addition the weapon mechanics have also changed, with certain guns requiring reloading, having recoil, and iron sights or scopes.

Reception 
The mod was mentioned by John Romero, who jokingly said that if id Software had released the original Doom with the features of Brutal Doom, they would have "destroyed the gaming industry". However, he later mentioned on his Twitter feed that Brutal Doom "is not how doom's supposed to be played." Dominic Tarason of Rock Paper Shotgun remarked how the mod has "risen to such ubiquity that it has spawned a whole parallel mod scene of its own" and considered it "a game in its own right at this point". Andras Neltz of Kotaku said that it was "shaping up to be one of the modding greats". TechRadar called it "the most modernised, spectacular Doom mod to date". Chris Plante of Polygon called it "incredible", "stomach-churning" and "hysterical".

Brutal Doom won the first-ever Cacoward in 2011 for "Best Gameplay Mod" and the "Mod of the Year" award by Mod DB in 2012 and 2017.

In 2021, Brutal Doom surpassed five million downloads on Mod DB.

See also 

Doom modding
Bloom (mod)

References

External links 
Official page on Facebook
Official repository at Mod DB
Sergeant Mark IV YouTube channel

First-person shooters
Doom mods
Video game mods
Sprite-based first-person shooters
Windows games
Linux games
MacOS games
Video games developed in Brazil